Gjemselund Stadion is a football stadium in Kongsvinger, Norway and the home ground of Norwegian third tier club Kongsvinger IL Toppfotball.
Until 2008, it was also used for track and field meets, having got rubber track in 1986. The venue hosted the Norwegian Athletics Championships in 1968.
 The stadium received artificial turf with under-soil heating ahead of the 2009 season.

Attendances
The record attendance of 6,794 spectators dates from 26 June 1983, when Kongsvinger lost a top division game against Vålerengen with the score 0–3. Capacity has since been reduced by new regulations.

Average attendances
This shows the average attendance on Kongsvinger's home games in the league since 2012.

References

External links
 Gjemselund Stadion - Nordic Stadiums

Football venues in Norway
Eliteserien venues
Defunct athletics (track and field) venues in Norway
Sports venues completed in 1953
1953 establishments in Norway
Sports venues in Innlandet
Kongsvinger IL Toppfotball
Kongsvinger